Bering Sea Beast (also known as Beast of the Bering Sea) is a 2013 horror television film directed by Don E. Fauntleroy and written by Brook Durham.

A sea salvage operation in the Bering Sea disturbs a species of monstrous underwater creatures known as sea vampires.

Premise
With their family killed by a swarm of vampiric sea creatures. Bering sea adventurers Joe and Donna, team up with a marine biologist and her devoted deckhand to render the species extinct.

Cast
 Cassie Scerbo as Donna Hunter
 Brandon Beemer as Owen Powers
 Jaqueline Fleming as Megan Arthur
 Jonathan Lipnicki as Joe
 Kevin Dobson as Glenn Hunter
 Garin Sparks as Dump Truck Driver
 Jimmy Sweetwater as Jimmy
 Lawrence Turner as Thorne
 Michael Papajohn as Jonas
 Dane Rhoades as Jeb
 Isaiah Laborde as Frank
 Tim J. Smith as Frik
 George Brooks as Dredge Captain

References

External links

2013 television films
2013 films
Films directed by Don E. FauntLeRoy
Sony Pictures direct-to-video films